Artur Edikovich Naifonov (born 10 May 1997) is a Russian freestyle wrestler, of Ossetian heritage, who competes at 86 kilograms. Naifonov is an Olympic Games medalist, World Championship medalist, three-time European Continental champion and a three-time Russian National champion (four-time finalist).

Naifonov is a survivor of the 2004 Beslan school siege along with his sister, both receiving shrapnel wounds. His mother was killed in crossfire.

Freestyle record 

! colspan="7"| International Senior Freestyle Matches
|-
!  Res.
!  Record
!  Opponent
!  Score
!  Date
!  Event
!  Location
|-
! style=background:white colspan=7 |
|-
|Win
|90–10
|align=left| Azamat Dauletbekov
|style="font-size:88%"|3-0
|style="font-size:88%" rowspan=3|October 3, 2021
|-
|Loss
|89–10
|align=left| Hassan Yazdani
|style="font-size:88%"|2-8
|style="font-size:88%" rowspan=3|October 2, 2021
|-
|Win
|89–9
|align=left| Taimuraz Friev
|style="font-size:88%"|5–2
|-
|Win
|88–9
|align=left| Hayato Ishiguro
|style="font-size:88%"|TF 11–0
|-
! style=background:white colspan=7 |
|-
|Win
|87–9
|align=left| Javrail Shapiev
|style="font-size:88%"|2–0
|style="font-size:88%"|August 5, 2021
|style="font-size:88%" rowspan=4|2020 Summer Olympics
|style="text-align:left;font-size:88%;" rowspan=4|
 Tokyo, Japan
|-
|Loss
|86–9
|align=left| Hassan Yazdani
|style="font-size:88%"|1–7
|style="font-size:88%" rowspan=3|August 4, 2021
|-
|Win
|86–8
|align=left| Osman Göçen
|style="font-size:88%"|TF 12–1
|-
|Win
|85–8
|align=left| Boris Makojev
|style="font-size:88%"|6–0
|-
! style=background:white colspan=7 | 
|-
|Win
|84–8
|align=left| Sandro Aminashvili
|style="font-size:88%"|8–0
|style="font-size:88%" rowspan=4|AprIl 19–21, 2021
|style="font-size:88%" rowspan=4|2021 European Continental Championships
|style="text-align:left;font-size:88%;" rowspan=4|
 Warsaw, Poland
|-
|Win
|83–8
|align=left| Boris Makojev
|style="font-size:88%"|9–0
|-
|Win
|82–8
|align=left| Myles Amine 
|style="font-size:88%"|2–0
|-
|Win
|81–8
|align=left| Gadzhimurad Magomedsaidov
|style="font-size:88%"|10–2
|-
! style=background:white colspan=7 | 
|-
|Win
|80–8
|align=left| Dauren Kurugliev
|style="font-size:88%"|2–1
|style="font-size:88%" rowspan=5|March 11–14, 2021
|style="font-size:88%" rowspan=5|2021 Russian National Freestyle Wrestling Championships
|style="text-align:left;font-size:88%;" rowspan=5|
 Ulan-Ude, Russia
|-
|Win
|79–8
|align=left| Magomed Ramazanov
|style="font-size:88%"|10–8
|-
|Win
|78–8
|align=left| Khabi Khashpakov
|style="font-size:88%"|2–1
|-
|Win
|77–8
|align=left| Nikita Sofronov
|style="font-size:88%"|TF 11–0
|-
|Win
|76–8
|align=left| Magomed Gusbanov
|style="font-size:88%"|
|-
! style=background:white colspan=7 | 
|-
|Loss
|75–8
|align=left| Dauren Kurugliev
|style="font-size:88%"|1–2
|style="font-size:88%" rowspan=5|October 16–18, 2020
|style="font-size:88%" rowspan=5|2020 Russian National Freestyle Wrestling Championships
|style="text-align:left;font-size:88%;" rowspan=5|
 Naro-Fominsk, Russia
|-
|Win
|75–7
|align=left| Arsen-Ali Musalaliev
|style="font-size:88%"|8–0
|-
|Win
|74–7
|align=left| Magomedsharif Biyakaev
|style="font-size:88%"|4–0
|-
|Win
|73–7
|align=left| Aslanbek Gvaramia
|style="font-size:88%"|TF 11–0
|-
|Win
|72–7
|align=left| Magomed Gusbanov
|style="font-size:88%"|8–2
|-
! style=background:white colspan=7 | 
|-
|Win
|71–7
|align=left| Myles Amine
|style="font-size:88%"|4–0
|style="font-size:88%" rowspan=5|February 15–16, 2020
|style="font-size:88%" rowspan=5|2020 European Continental Championships
|style="text-align:left;font-size:88%;" rowspan=5|
 Rome, Italy
|-
|Win
|70–7
|align=left| Boris Makojev
|style="font-size:88%"|3–0
|-
|Win
|69–7
|align=left| Radosław Marcinkiewicz
|style="font-size:88%"|TF 10–0
|-
|Win
|68–7
|align=left| Abubakr Abakarov
|style="font-size:88%"|8–2
|-
|Win
|67–7
|align=left| Akhmed Magamaev
|style="font-size:88%"|5–0
|-
! style=background:white colspan=7 | 
|-
|Win
|66–7
|align=left| Dauren Kurugliev
|style="font-size:88%"|2–1
|style="font-size:88%" rowspan=5|January 23–26, 2020
|style="font-size:88%" rowspan=5|Golden Grand Prix Ivan Yarygin 2020
|style="text-align:left;font-size:88%;" rowspan=5|
 Krasnoyarsk, Russia
|-
|Win
|65–7
|align=left| Arsen-Ali Musalaliev
|style="font-size:88%"|2–0
|-
|Win
|64–7
|align=left| Zaur Makiev
|style="font-size:88%"|2–2
|-
|Win
|63–7
|align=left| Brett Pfarr
|style="font-size:88%"|6–0
|-
|Win
|62–7
|align=left| Shinetur Narmandakh
|style="font-size:88%"|TF 10–0
|-
! style=background:white colspan=7 |
|-
|Win
|61–7
|align=left| Ahmed Dudarov
|style="font-size:88%"|TF 10–0
|style="font-size:88%"rowspan=5|October 21–24, 2019
|style="font-size:88%"rowspan=5|2019 Military World Games
|style="text-align:left;font-size:88%;"rowspan=5|
 Warsaw, Poland
|-
|Win
|60–7
|align=left| Adilet Davlumbaev
|style="font-size:88%"|TF 13–2
|-
|Win
|59–7
|align=left| Akhmed Aibuev
|style="font-size:88%"|7–0
|-
|Win
|58–7
|align=left| Lee Seungdong
|style="font-size:88%"|TF 11–0
|-
|Win
|57–7
|align=left| Ahmad Yousef Bazrighaleh
|style="font-size:88%"|6–3
|-
! style=background:white colspan=7 |
|-
|Win
|56–7
|align=left| Myles Amine
|style="font-size:88%"|6–0
|style="font-size:88%"rowspan=6|September 21–22, 2019
|style="font-size:88%"rowspan=6|2019 World Wrestling Championships
|style="text-align:left;font-size:88%;"rowspan=6|
 Nur-Sultan, Kazakhstan
|-
|Win
|55–7
|align=left| István Veréb
|style="font-size:88%"|TF 11–1
|-
|Loss
|54–7
|align=left| Hassan Yazdani
|style="font-size:88%"|Fall
|-
|Win
|54–6
|align=left| Javrail Shapiev
|style="font-size:88%"|6–0
|-
|Win
|53–6
|align=left| Piotr Ianulov
|style="font-size:88%"|4–0
|-
|Win
|52–6
|align=left| Ville Heino
|style="font-size:88%"|5–1
|-
! style=background:white colspan=7 |
|-
|Win
|51–6
|align=left| Zbigniew Baranowski
|style="font-size:88%"|4–1
|style="font-size:88%"rowspan=4|August 2–4, 2019
|style="font-size:88%"rowspan=4|2019 Ziolkowski, Pytlasinski Memorial
|style="text-align:left;font-size:88%;"rowspan=4|
 Warsaw, Poland
|-
|Win
|50–6
|align=left| Fatih Erdin
|style="font-size:88%"|Fall
|-
|Win
|49–6
|align=left| Adilet Davlmbayev
|style="font-size:88%"|8–2
|-
|Win
|48–6
|align=left| Radosław Marcinkiewicz
|style="font-size:88%"|8–1
|-
! style=background:white colspan=7 | 
|-
|Win
|47–6
|align=left| Vladislav Valiev
|style="font-size:88%"|4–2
|style="font-size:88%" rowspan=5|July 5–7, 2019
|style="font-size:88%" rowspan=5|2019 Russian National Freestyle Wrestling Championships
|style="text-align:left;font-size:88%;" rowspan=5|
 Sochi, Russia
|-
|Win
|46–6
|align=left| Soslan Ktsoyev
|style="font-size:88%"|4–0
|-
|Win
|45–6
|align=left| Zaur Makiev
|style="font-size:88%"|4–0
|-
|Win
|44–6
|align=left| Magomed Ramazanov
|style="font-size:88%"|7–3
|-
|Win
|43–6
|align=left| Matvey Yakomaskin
|style="font-size:88%"|TF 10–0
|-
! style=background:white colspan=7 | 
|-
|Win
|42–6
|align=left| Dauren Kurugliev
|style="font-size:88%"|2–2
|style="font-size:88%" rowspan=5|May 1–3, 2019
|style="font-size:88%" rowspan=5|2019 Ali Aliev Memorial
|style="text-align:left;font-size:88%;" rowspan=5|
 Kaspiysk, Russia
|-
|Win
|41–6
|align=left| Arsen-Ali Musalaliev
|style="font-size:88%"|4–2
|-
|Win
|40–6
|align=left| Javrail Shapiev
|style="font-size:88%"|3–1
|-
|Win
|39–6
|align=left| Rasul Tsikhayeu
|style="font-size:88%"|4–3
|-
|Win
|38–6
|align=left| Denis Balaur
|style="font-size:88%"|3–1
|-
! style=background:white colspan=7 | 
|-
|Loss
|37–6
|align=left| Slavik Naniev
|style="font-size:88%"|Fall
|style="font-size:88%" rowspan=2|December 7–9, 2018
|style="font-size:88%" rowspan=2|2018 Alans International
|style="text-align:left;font-size:88%;" rowspan=2|
 Vladikavkaz, Russia
|-
|Win
|37–5
|align=left| Arseniy Khubaev
|style="font-size:88%"|6–0
|-
! style=background:white colspan=7 | 
|-
|Loss
|36–5
|align=left| Kamran Ghasempour
|style="font-size:88%"|1–4
|style="font-size:88%" rowspan=5|November 12–18, 2018
|style="font-size:88%" rowspan=5|2018 U23 World Wrestling Championships
|style="text-align:left;font-size:88%;" rowspan=5|
 Bucharest, Romania
|-
|Win
|36–4
|align=left| Murad Süleymanov
|style="font-size:88%"|TF 14–4
|-
|Win
|35–4
|align=left| Alex Moore
|style="font-size:88%"|TF 11–0
|-
|Win
|34–4
|align=left| Uphar Sharma
|style="font-size:88%"|TF 10–0
|-
|Win
|33–4
|align=left| Michał Bielawski
|style="font-size:88%"|TF 10–0
|-
! style=background:white colspan=7 | 
|-
|Win
|32–4
|align=left| Anzor Urishev
|style="font-size:88%"|4–3
|style="font-size:88%" rowspan=3|September 6–8, 2018
|style="font-size:88%" rowspan=3|2018 Dmitry Korkin International Memorial
|style="text-align:left;font-size:88%;" rowspan=3|
 Yakutsk, Russia
|-
|Win
|31–4
|align=left| Turtogtokh Luvsandorj
|style="font-size:88%"|6–0
|-
|Win
|30–4
|align=left| Paredes Villagómez
|style="font-size:88%"|TF 10–0
|-
! style=background:white colspan=7 | 
|-
|Loss
|29–4
|align=left| Dauren Kurugliev
|style="font-size:88%"|1–2
|style="font-size:88%" rowspan=3|August 3–5, 2018
|style="font-size:88%" rowspan=3|2018 Russian National Freestyle Wrestling Championships
|style="text-align:left;font-size:88%;" rowspan=3|
 Odintsovo, Russia
|-
|Win
|29–3
|align=left| Zelimkhan Minkailov
|style="font-size:88%"|3–0
|-
|Win
|28–3
|align=left| Alik Shebzukhov
|style="font-size:88%"|TF 10–0
|-
! style=background:white colspan=7 | 
|-
|Win
|27–3
|align=left| Alexander Gostiev
|style="font-size:88%"|1–1
|style="font-size:88%" rowspan=5|May 5–6, 2018
|style="font-size:88%" rowspan=5|2018 European Continental Championships
|style="text-align:left;font-size:88%;" rowspan=5|
 Kaspiysk, Russia
|-
|Win
|26–3
|align=left| Fatih Erdin
|style="font-size:88%"|4–2
|-
|Win
|25–3
|align=left| Shamil Kudiyamagomedov
|style="font-size:88%"|7–6
|-
|Win
|24–3
|align=left| Zbigniew Baranowski
|style="font-size:88%"|9–2
|-
|Win
|23–3
|align=left| István Veréb
|style="font-size:88%"|5–0
|-
! style=background:white colspan=7 | 
|-
|Win
|22–3
|align=left| Taimuraz Friev
|style="font-size:88%"|INJ
|style="font-size:88%" rowspan=5|March 22–25, 2018
|style="font-size:88%" rowspan=5|2018 Dan Kolov - Nikola Petrov Memorial
|style="text-align:left;font-size:88%;" rowspan=5|
 Sofia, Bulgaria
|-
|Win
|21–3
|align=left| Georgy Rubaev
|style="font-size:88%"|DQ
|-
|Win
|20–3
|align=left| Shamil Kudiyamagomedov
|style="font-size:88%"|5–4
|-
|Win
|19–3
|align=left| Ahmet Bilici
|style="font-size:88%"|TF 10–0
|-
|Win
|18–3
|align=left| Vladislav Valiev
|style="font-size:88%"|3–2
|-
! style=background:white colspan=7 | 
|-
|Win
|17–3
|align=left| Yurieski Torreblanca
|style="font-size:88%"|2–1
|style="font-size:88%" rowspan=4|January 28, 2018
|style="font-size:88%" rowspan=4|Golden Grand Prix Ivan Yarygin 2018
|style="text-align:left;font-size:88%;" rowspan=4|
 Krasnoyarsk, Russia
|-
|Loss
|16–3
|align=left| David Taylor
|style="font-size:88%"|Fall
|-
|Win
|16–2
|align=left| Dauren Kurugliev
|style="font-size:88%"|3–2
|-
|Win
|15–2
|align=left| Zushen Lin
|style="font-size:88%"|TF 10–0
|-
! style=background:white colspan=7 | 
|-
|Win
|14–2
|align=left| Vladislav Valiev
|style="font-size:88%"|1–1
|style="font-size:88%" rowspan=4|November 17–19, 2017
|style="font-size:88%" rowspan=4|2017 Alans International
|style="text-align:left;font-size:88%;" rowspan=4|
 Vladikavkaz, Russia
|-
|Win
|13–2
|align=left| Alexander Gostiev
|style="font-size:88%"|4–4
|-
|Win
|12–2
|align=left| Batyrbek Tsakulov
|style="font-size:88%"|11–4
|-
|Win
|11–2
|align=left| Gulaev Akhsarbek
|style="font-size:88%"|FF
|-
! style=background:white colspan=7 | 
|-
|Win
|10–2
|align=left| Alexander Gostiev
|style="font-size:88%"|PP
|style="font-size:88%" rowspan=3|November 9–13, 2017
|style="font-size:88%" rowspan=3|2017 Alrosa Team Cup
|style="text-align:left;font-size:88%;" rowspan=3|
 Moscow, Russia
|-
|Win
|9–2
|align=left| Pavel Untila
|style="font-size:88%"|TF
|-
|Win
|8–2
|align=left| Davit Khutsishvili
|style="font-size:88%"|PP
|-
! style=background:white colspan=7 | 
|-
|Win
|7–2
|align=left| Arseni Khubaev
|style="font-size:88%"|6–2
|style="font-size:88%" rowspan=4|October 28–29, 2017
|style="font-size:88%" rowspan=4|2017 Yugra Cup
|style="text-align:left;font-size:88%;" rowspan=4|
 Nefteyugansk, Russia
|-
|Loss
|6–2
|align=left| Zaur Makiev
|style="font-size:88%"|5–12
|-
|Win
|6–1
|align=left| Aleksandr Zelenkov
|style="font-size:88%"|6–1
|-
|Win
|5–1
|align=left| Kanat Berdiyev
|style="font-size:88%"|TF 10–0
|-
! style=background:white colspan=7 | 
|-
|Win
|4–1
|align=left| Batyrbek Tsakulov
|style="font-size:88%"|4–0
|style="font-size:88%" rowspan=4|October 7–8, 2017
|style="font-size:88%" rowspan=4|2017 Stepan Sargsyan Cup
|style="text-align:left;font-size:88%;" rowspan=4|
 Vanadzor, Armenia
|-
|Win
|3–1
|align=left| David Khutsishvili
|style="font-size:88%"|TF 10–0
|-
|Win
|2–1
|align=left| Saba Chikhradze
|style="font-size:88%"|TF 12–2
|-
|Win
|1–1
|align=left| Vahe Tamrazyan
|style="font-size:88%"|8–1
|-
! style=background:white colspan=7 | 
|-
|Loss
|0–1
|align=left| Akhmed Magamaev
|style="font-size:88%"|1–6
|style="font-size:88%"|January 28, 2017
|style="font-size:88%"|Golden Grand Prix Ivan Yarygin 2017
|style="text-align:left;font-size:88%;"|
 Krasnoyarsk, Russia
|-

References

External links
 

1997 births
Living people
People from Nizhnevartovsk
Russian people of Ossetian descent
Russian male sport wrestlers
European Wrestling Championships medalists
World Wrestling Championships medalists
Wrestlers at the 2020 Summer Olympics
Olympic bronze medalists for the Russian Olympic Committee athletes
Olympic medalists in wrestling
Medalists at the 2020 Summer Olympics
Survivors of terrorist attacks
Beslan school siege
European Wrestling Champions
Sportspeople from Khanty-Mansi Autonomous Okrug
Olympic wrestlers of Russia
21st-century Russian people